John Sharp Higham (14 June 1857 – 5 January 1932) was a British Liberal Party politician and cotton manufacturer.

Background
A son of Eli Higham, a cotton manufacturer from Accrington. He was educated privately. He married in 1899, Pollie Hartley, daughter of William Pickles Hartley of Southport. They had three sons and one daughter.

Career
He was Chairman of his father-in-law's business, W. P. Hartley Ltd, jam manufacturers. He was also Chairman of his family cotton manufacturing business, Highams Ltd of Accrington, Rochdale and Manchester. He served on Accrington Town Council. He was Mayor of Accrington from 1899 to 1901. He was a member of Lancashire County Council for twelve years. He was a Justice of the Peace in Accrington. He was Liberal MP for the Sowerby Division of Yorkshire from 1904 to 1918. He was elected at the first time of asking in 1904, holding the Liberal seat at a by-election;

In parliament, he was an advanced radical in favour of Church Disestablishment, Irish Home Rule and
the Nationalization of the Railways. 

At the General Election of December 1910, he was re-elected unopposed.
He was a Member of the Land Values Group which favoured rating reform. He defended his seat at the General Election of 1918, the 'coupon' election; he stood as a Liberal but when offered endorsement from the Coalition Government, rejected it. As a result, he finished third;

After the war he served as President of Southport Liberal Association. He was Treasurer of Lancashire and Cheshire Band of Hope and Temperance Union. He was President of the United Kingdom Commercial Travellers’ Association from 1926 to 1927.

Sources
Who Was Who
British parliamentary election results 1885–1918, Craig, F. W. S.

References

External links 
Who Was Who; http://www.ukwhoswho.com

1857 births
1932 deaths
English justices of the peace
Members of Lancashire County Council
Liberal Party (UK) MPs for English constituencies
UK MPs 1900–1906
UK MPs 1906–1910
UK MPs 1910
UK MPs 1910–1918